Romeo C. Espino (December 20, 1914 - February 17, 2003) was a Filipino general who served as Chief of Staff of the Armed Forces of the Philippines from 1971 to 1980.

Early life and education
Espino was born on December 20, 1914, and was a native of Samal, Bataan. He finished his college education at the University of the Philippines in 1937.

Career
Espino joined the Philippine Army in 1941 as an Reserve Officers' Training Corps (ROTC) officer and fought against the Japanese during their occupation of the Philippines in World War II. He served as Commanding General of the Philippine Army from January 13, 1967, until May 29, 1968.

On January 15, 1972, then President Ferdinand Marcos appointed him as Chief of Staff of the Armed Forces of the Philippines succeeding Manuel Yan. He was also an implementer of the martial law of President Marcos. He was also named part of the Rolex 12 due to being a close associate of Marcos. Named members of the Rolex 12 allegedly received luxury watches from Marcos hence the label.

He led the military against the Communist rebellion of the New People's Army (NPA) and the Moro National Liberation Front in the Moro conflict. He was credited for the arrest of NPA leader Bernabe Buscayno and defector Victor Corpus in 1976. Espino ended his tenure on August 15, 1981, and was replaced by Fabian Ver.

Espino also headed the Philippine Red Cross.

Death
Espino died on February 17, 2003, and was buried at the Libingan ng mga Bayani by virtue of being a former Chief of Staff.

Personal life
Espino was married to Bella Espino with whom he had five children.

References

Chairmen of the Joint Chiefs (Philippines)
Filipino generals
Filipino military personnel of World War II
Ferdinand Marcos administration personnel
1914 births
2003 deaths
Philippine Army generals
People from Bataan
University of the Philippines alumni